The Podmoskovie Ice Palace (Podmoskovye means "Moscow Region") is an indoor arena in Voskresensk, Moscow Oblast. It is the home arena of Khimik Voskresensk of the Supreme Hockey League (VHL) and 7.62 of the Zhenskaya Hockey League (ZhHL).

References
This article contains content translated from the existing Russian Wikipedia article at :ru:Подмосковье (ледовый дворец); see its history for attribution.

Indoor arenas in Russia
Indoor ice hockey venues in Russia
Khimik Voskresensk
Buildings and structures in Moscow Oblast